The 2001 VIP Petfoods GT Production Showroom Showdown was an endurance race for Australian GT Production Cars. The event was staged at the Mount Panorama Circuit, Bathurst, New South Wales, Australia on Saturday 6 October 2001 as a support event on program for the 2001 V8 Supercar 1000. After four years of the race occurring as a three-hour time limited race, the race was shortened to two hours duration.

The race was won by Graham Alexander and John Woodberry driving a Mitsubishi Lancer RS-E Evolution V won the race by 16 seconds ahead of the Ford Mustang SVT Cobra RA driven by John Bowe and Chris Dunn.

Class structure
Cars competed in the following five classes:
Class A : High Performance Cars - Under $150,000
Class B : Sports Touring Cars - Under $80,000
Class C : V8 Production Cars - Under $50,000
Class D : Six Cylinder Production Touring Cars
Class E : Four Cylinder Production Touring Cars

Results

References

Auto Action, 11–17 October 2001
 Natsoft Race Result*

Motorsport in Bathurst, New South Wales
VIP